Catholic Presbyterian Church is a historic Presbyterian church in Chester, South Carolina. The church congregation was founded in 1759 and sixty-two men from the church served in the Revolutionary War. Several are buried nearby. The current brick church building, the third located on the same site, was constructed in 1842 and added to the National Register of Historic Places in 1971.

References

Presbyterian churches in South Carolina
Churches on the National Register of Historic Places in South Carolina
Churches completed in 1842
19th-century Presbyterian church buildings in the United States
Buildings and structures in Chester County, South Carolina
National Register of Historic Places in Chester County, South Carolina
1759 establishments in South Carolina